Giovanella is a genus of blow fly in the family Mesembrinellidae.

Species
G. bolivar Bonatto and Marinoni, 2005
G. carvalhoi Wolff et al., 2013

References

Mesembrinellidae
Diptera of South America